Visone is a comune (municipality) in the Province of Alessandria in the Italian region Piedmont, located about  southeast of Turin and about  southwest of Alessandria. Its name becomes from the homonymous Visone creek, that flows into its territory and enters Bormida river not far from the village.

Visone borders the following municipalities: Acqui Terme, Grognardo, Morbello, Morsasco, Prasco, and Strevi.

History 
The first mention of the village of Visone dates back to May 4, 991, when Anselmo, son of Aleramo marquis of Montferrat, and his wife Gisla sign the foundation charter of St. Quentin abbey in Spigno Monferrato. In this period a large amount of residents is made by people of Longobard origin. But, some more ancient documents, about fifty years before mention a church placed at the confluence of the Caramagna creek with the Bormida river, into the actual municipal territory of Visone.

In the beginning of the 13th cent., a lot of possessions in this country are recognized to Manfredo Boccaccio by the bishop of Acqui. His family will hold those inheritances for almost one century and a half, often in conflict with the bishop's Table on the grounds of the borders.

On October 1450, the Acqui's Cathedral chapter met into the church of St. Mary of Graces in Visone, to elect the new bishop, because there was a terrible plague outbreak in Acqui.

In 1469 the feud moved in the hands of the Malaspina family. In this period the castle is hugely restored by Antoniotto Malaspina. In 1519 Giovanni Malaspina sells the feud to Mary Boverio della Corba, first lady-in-waiting of Anne of Alençon, marquise of Montferrat.

At the middle of the 17th cent. Raimond of Cardona, descendant of Mary Boverio, sells the feuds and the castle to the noble Louis Centurione-Scotto, whose family will keep it up to the first half of the 20th century.

In the night of April 18 to 19, 1861, a flood made a large part of the rock into a landslide, with a consequent collapse of the church of St. Maty of Graces and a lot of houses in the ancient hamlet of Malborghetto.

In 1929 the municipality was suppressed, and joined to the one of Acqui Terme, and it has been restored back starting from 1948, following the liberation.

References

Cities and towns in Piedmont